The Equinox of the Gods is a book first published in 1936 detailing the events and circumstances leading up to Aleister Crowley's 1904 transcription of The Book of the Law, the central text of Thelema.

Included in The Equinox of the Gods are a facsimile of Crowley's handwritten manuscript of The Book of the Law, personal diary extracts, and a full color reproduction of the Stèle of Revealing.

Editions

Notes

External links
 The Equinox of the Gods — full text of the book

Thelemite texts
Works by Aleister Crowley
1936 books